Ashish Hooda (born 20 September 1989) is an Indian first-class cricketer who plays for Haryana. He was the joint-leading wicket-taker for Haryana in the 2017–18 Ranji Trophy, with 19 dismissals in six matches.

References

External links
 

1989 births
Living people
Indian cricketers
Haryana cricketers
People from Rohtak
Cricketers from Haryana